Příchovice is a municipality and village in Plzeň-South District in the Plzeň Region of the Czech Republic. It has about 1,200 inhabitants.

Administrative parts
Villages of Kucíny and Zálesí are administrative parts of Příchovice.

References

External links

Villages in Plzeň-South District